Los Santos is a municipality located in the province of Salamanca, Castile and León, Spain.

See also
Los Santos mine

References

Municipalities in the Province of Salamanca